London Buses route 328 is a Transport for London contracted bus route in London, England. Running between Golders Green station and Chelsea World's End, it is operated by Metroline.

History

Route 328 commenced operating on 29 May 1999 between Golders Green station and Chelsea via West Hampstead, Kilburn, Maida Hill, Notting Hill Gate, Kensington High Street and Earl's Court. It was initially operated by First London's Westbourne Park garage with Marshall Capital bodied Dennis Darts. It replaced parts of  routes 28 and 31.

Upon being re-tendered and retained by First London from 5 June 2004, the route was converted to double deck operation with Wright Eclipse Gemini bodied Volvo B7TLs.

Early enthusiasm for hybrid vehicle technology, in which all or part of the motive power is provided by electricity rather than directly by the engine, saw a number of small batches of experimental vehicles ordered. One of the routes selected for trials was route 328.

When next re-tendered, the route was retained by First London with a new contract commencing on 30 April 2011. In October 2011, it moved from Westbourne Park to Atlas Road garage while the former was partially closed to make way for Elizabeth line construction works.

On 22 June 2013, route 328 was included in the sale of First London's Atlas Road garage to Tower Transit. With the closure of Atlas Road garage, route 328 returned to Westbourne Park in June 2017.

On 1 May 2021, Route 328 will be passed on to Metroline from Cricklewood Garage.

In 2022, Transport for London proposed to reroute bus route 328 to run to Hammersmith bus station as part of wider bus cuts. However, the changes did not go ahead.

Incidents
On 21 June 2004, A female bus driver on route 328 was shot in the stomach with a nail gun on Great Western Road.
On 27 February 2008, a young woman was hit by a northbound 328 near St Mary Abbots on Kensington Church Street.

Current route
Golders Green station  
West Hampstead West End Green
West Hampstead station   
Kilburn High Road station 
Kilburn Park station 
Maida Hill
Westbourne Park station 
Notting Hill Gate station 
High Street Kensington station 
Earl's Court station 
Chelsea World's End

References

External links

328 bus route - Transport for London

Bus routes in London
Transport in the London Borough of Barnet
Transport in the London Borough of Brent
Transport in the London Borough of Camden
Transport in the Royal Borough of Kensington and Chelsea